Animation-Comic-Game Hong Kong (ACGHK) is a material-entertainment fair and book fair focusing on animations, manga, and games based in Hong Kong. It is held annually at the Hong Kong Convention and Exhibition Centre usually around August, exhibiting and selling comic books and comic-related / animation-related / game-related products. The categories of products and services in ACGHK have steadily expanded over the years.

History

The fair was previously called Hong Kong Comics Festival (香港漫畫節). In 2004 the convention was sponsored by  Animax Hong Kong, and was called the 2004 Animax Summer FUNtasy.

Since 2006, Hong Kong Comics Festival had been renamed as Ani-Com Hong Kong (香港動漫節) and was held with Hong Kong Game Fair (香港電玩展) together.

Animation-Comic-Game Hong Kong (ACGHK, traditional ) is the merging of Ani-Com Hong Kong (香港動漫節) and Hong Kong Game Fair (香港電玩展) since 2008. ACGHK is a material-entertainment fair and book fair focusing on animations, manhua (Chinese comics) and games in Hong Kong. It is held annually at the Hong Kong Convention and Exhibition Centre usually around August.

Events and conventions
Other than comics, the convention also sells products related to comics, anime, and video games; these sales are hugely profitable as most of them are limited-edition products that attract teenagers to start queuing up overnight or even a day or two before.

The convention also features shows, cosplay, and dance/gaming competitions. The annual Hong Kong Game Fair is held in conjunction with the comics festival. Companies such as Microsoft's Xbox have large kiosks and displays in the show. In the Samsung Game Girl competition, 11 girls compete for the "Game Girl" title; winners end up entering entertainment or modeling, becoming famous in an extremely short time. Because the exhibition is extremely crowded, large corporations purchase accident insurance and hire extra security for their top models.

In 2010 the convention took place on July 30–August 3 at the HKCEC. The convention will also take place in Guangzhou, China, from October 2–6, during China's weeklong National Day of the People's Republic of China holiday.

https://web.archive.org/web/20100820204138/http://www.ani-com.hk/pdf2010/exhibitors.pdf

Performers
 2009 – Shoko Nakagawa, Arisa Noto (能登有沙)
 2010 – Mr., 謝安琪, 關楚耀, 謝慧玲舞蹈學院. MC Jin, 官恩娜, 高海寧, Khole Chu, Shina, Puffy, Castle, Fundanjuku, Haze, SCANDAL

See also
 Comic World
 Manhua

External links

 stage programme (PDF)
 autograph (PDF)
 Ani-Com Hong Kong official homepage
 Photos from 2006 Ani-Com + Game Fair, courtesy of Vince K. Chan
 Photos from 2004 Animax Summer Funtasy, courtesy of Vince K. Chan
 Report on the french site Kochipan

Annual fairs
Festivals in Hong Kong
Book fairs in China
Multigenre conventions
Comics conventions
Gaming conventions